Kiiko Watanabe is a former international table tennis player from Japan.

Table tennis career
From 1954 to 1957 she won ten medals in singles, doubles and in team events in the World Table Tennis Championships.

The ten World Championship medals included two gold medals in the team event for Japan.

See also
 List of table tennis players
 List of World Table Tennis Championships medalists

References

Japanese female table tennis players
Living people
Year of birth missing (living people)
Place of birth missing (living people)